In mathematics, the Jacobian conjecture is a famous unsolved problem concerning polynomials in several variables. It states that if a polynomial function from an n-dimensional space to itself has Jacobian determinant which is a non-zero constant, then the function has a polynomial inverse. It was first conjectured in 1939 by Ott-Heinrich Keller, and widely publicized by Shreeram Abhyankar, as an example of a difficult question in algebraic geometry that can be understood using little beyond a knowledge of calculus.

The Jacobian conjecture is notorious for the large number of attempted proofs that turned out to contain subtle errors. As of 2018, there are no plausible claims to have proved it. Even the two-variable case has resisted all efforts. There are currently no known compelling reasons for believing the conjecture to be true, and according to van den Essen there are some suspicions that the conjecture is in fact false for large numbers of variables (indeed, there is equally also no compelling evidence to support these suspicions).  The Jacobian conjecture is number 16 in Stephen Smale's 1998 list of Mathematical Problems for the Next Century.

The Jacobian determinant
Let N > 1 be a fixed integer and consider  polynomials f1, ..., fN in variables X1, ..., XN with coefficients  in a field k. Then we define a vector-valued function F: kN → kN by setting:

 F(X1, ..., XN) = (f1(X1, ...,XN),..., fN(X1,...,XN)).

Any map F: kN → kN arising in this way is called a polynomial mapping.

The Jacobian determinant of F, denoted by JF, is defined as the determinant of the N × N Jacobian matrix consisting of the partial derivatives of fi with respect to Xj:

then JF is itself a polynomial function of the N variables X1, ..., XN.

Formulation of the conjecture
It follows from the multivariable chain rule that if F has a polynomial inverse function G: kN → kN, then JF has a polynomial reciprocal, so is a nonzero constant. The Jacobian conjecture is the following partial converse:

Jacobian conjecture: Let k have characteristic 0. If JF is a non-zero constant, then F has an inverse function G: kN → kN which is regular, meaning its components are polynomials.

According to van den Essen, the problem was first conjectured by Keller in 1939 for the limited case of two variables and integer coefficients.

The obvious analogue of the Jacobian conjecture fails if k has characteristic p > 0 even for one variable. The characteristic of a field, if it is not zero, must be prime, so at least 2. The polynomial  has derivative  which is 1 (because px is 0) but it has no inverse function. However,  suggested extending the Jacobian conjecture to characteristic  by adding the hypothesis that p does not divide the degree of the field extension .

The existence of a polynomial inverse is obvious if F is simply a set of functions linear in the variables, because then the inverse will also be a set of linear functions. A very simple non-linear example would be if

in which case the Jacobian matrix is

whose determinant is the constant 1. We can then write the inverse as the polynomials

But if we modify F slightly, as

then the determinant is not constant, the Jacobian conjecture does not apply, and in fact we find:

The expression for x is not a polynomial.

The condition JF ≠ 0 is related to the inverse function theorem in multivariable calculus. In fact for smooth functions (and so in particular for polynomials) a smooth local inverse function to F exists at every point where JF is non-zero. For example, the map x → x + x3 has a smooth global inverse, but the inverse is not polynomial.

Results
Stuart Sui-Sheng Wang proved the Jacobian conjecture for polynomials of degree 2. Hyman Bass, Edwin Connell, and David Wright showed that the general case follows from the special case where the polynomials are of degree 3, or even more specifically, of cubic homogeneous type, meaning  of the form F = (X1 + H1, ..., Xn + Hn), where each Hi is either zero or a homogeneous cubic. Ludwik Drużkowski showed that one may further assume that  the map is of cubic linear type, meaning that the nonzero Hi are cubes of homogeneous linear polynomials. It seems that Drużkowski's reduction is one most promising way to go forward. These reductions introduce additional variables and so are not available for fixed N.

Edwin Connell and Lou van den Dries proved that if the Jacobian conjecture is false, then it has a counterexample with integer coefficients and Jacobian determinant 1. In consequence, the Jacobian conjecture is true either for all fields of characteristic 0 or for none.  For fixed dimension N, it is true if it holds for at least one algebraically closed field of characteristic 0.

Let k[X] denote the polynomial ring  and k[F] denote the k-subalgebra generated by f1, ..., fn.  For a given F, the Jacobian conjecture is true if, and only if,  . Keller (1939) proved the birational case, that is, where the two fields k(X) and k(F) are equal. The case where k(X) is a Galois extension of k(F) was proved by Andrew Campbell for complex maps and in general by Michael Razar and, independently, by David Wright. Tzuong-Tsieng Moh checked the conjecture for polynomials of degree at most 100 in two variables.

Michiel de Bondt and Arno van den Essen and Ludwik Drużkowski independently showed that it is enough to prove the Jacobian Conjecture for complex maps of cubic homogeneous type  with a symmetric Jacobian matrix, and further showed that the conjecture holds for maps of cubic linear type with a symmetric Jacobian matrix, over any field of characteristic 0.

The strong real Jacobian conjecture was that a real polynomial map with a nowhere vanishing Jacobian determinant has a smooth global inverse. That is equivalent to asking whether such a map is topologically a proper map, in which case it is a covering map of a simply connected manifold, hence invertible. Sergey Pinchuk constructed two variable counterexamples of total degree 35 and higher.

It is well-known that the Dixmier conjecture implies the Jacobian conjecture. Conversely, it is shown by Yoshifumi Tsuchimoto and independently by Alexei Belov-Kanel and Maxim Kontsevich that the Jacobian conjecture for 2N variables implies the Dixmier conjecture in N dimensions. A self-contained and purely algebraic proof of the last implication is also given by Kossivi Adjamagbo and Arno van den Essen who also proved in the same paper that these two conjectures are equivalent to the Poisson conjecture.

See also 

 List of unsolved problems in mathematics

References

External links
Web page of Tzuong-Tsieng Moh on the conjecture

Polynomials
Algebraic geometry
Conjectures
Unsolved problems in geometry